Tulk v Moxhay is a landmark English land law case that decided that in certain cases a restrictive covenant can "run with the land" (i.e. a future owner will be subject to the restriction) in equity. It is the reason Leicester Square exists today.

On the face of it disavowing that covenants can "run with the land" so as to avoid the strict common law former definition of "running with the land", the case has been explained by the Supreme Court of Canada, in 1950 as "Covenants enforceable under the rule of Tulk v Moxhay, are properly conceived as running with the land in equity" which summarises how the case has been interpreted and applied in decisions across common law jurisdictions.

Facts
In 1808, Charles Augustus Tulk, the owner of several parcels of land in Leicester Square, sold one of the plots to another person who made a covenant to keep the Garden Square "uncovered with buildings" such that it would remain a pleasure ground. Over the following years the land was sold several times over (passed through successive owners), eventually to the defendant, Edward Moxhay, in a contract which did not recite (nor expressly stipulate) the covenant.

The defendant, who was aware of the covenant at the time of purchase (had actual or constructive knowledge), refused to abide by the covenant as he claimed he was not in privity of contract and so was not bound by it.

Judgment
Lord Cottenham LC found in favour of the plaintiff and granted an injunction to restrain the defendant from violating the covenant. The Court noted that if the agreement had been a contract instead of a covenant, it would have been enforceable. Therefore the covenant was enforceable at equity, that is, when the plaintiff seeks an injunction as opposed to damages. The case stands for the proposition that a vertical (landlord-tenant) relation (privity of estate) is not needed for the burden of a covenant to run at equity.

The case approved earlier decisions of the Vice-Chancellor, Whatman v. Gibson 9  196 and Schreiber v. Creed 10 Sim. 35.

Significance
Prior to this case, for covenants to run, that is for the covenantee to take enforcement action or obtain damages against a breach, the breach and covenant had to be one of two classes:
Be a breach by one of the original parties of a conveyance of the freehold (or the other estates which existed in land at the time, apart from leasehold) and the parties remain the owner of at least part of the same estates at the time when the suit (today normally termed action or proceedings) is brought; this is known as having privity of contract and of estate
Be a breach of a covenant imposed by a landlord against a tenant at the time of the original lease; this is known as having "vertical privity"; in this type of privity the covenants may be positive or negative and unless very inequitable are generally held to be binding.

After the case, instead of the first narrow privity of estate, any restrictive covenant chiefly needed satisfy four lesser requirements to bind the successors in title:
The covenant must be restrictive 
At the date of the covenant, the covenantee owned land that was benefited by the covenant
The original parties intended the burden to run with the land to bind successors
The covenantor must take with notice of the covenant

The old vertical privity rules remain (as later slightly amended) in respect of positive covenants (stipulations requiring someone to do an action).

The extent of the rule was described in 1950 by Rand J of the Supreme Court of Canada in Noble v Alley as follows:

And in the next paragraph distinguished from any application to the terms and circumstances of the covenant in question in that case:

See also

English land law
English property law
Halsall v Brizell [1957] Ch 169
Judge-made law
Equity in law and ethics
Earl of Oxford's case (1615)
Judicature Acts (1873-1899)

Notes

References
Haywood v Brunswick Permanent Benefit Building Society (1881) 8 QBD 403
Marten v Flight Refuelling Ltd [1962] Ch 115
Federated Homes Ltd v Mill Lodge Properties Ltd [1979] EWCA Civ 3 [1980] 1 WLR 594, [1980] 1 All ER 371, 254 EG 39
Roake v Chandha [1984] Ch 40 [1984] 1 WLR 40 
Brunner v Greenslade [1971] 1 Ch 993
Westminster City Council v Duke of Westminster [1991] 4 All ER 1388

External links
Text of the court-approved Law Report of the judgment from Bailii

1848 in case law
1848 in British law
Covenant (law)
English land case law
Court of Chancery cases